The 2015–16 Liga Alef season saw Ironi Nesher (champions of the North Division) and Maccabi Sha'arayim (champions of the South Division) win the title and promotion to Liga Leumit.

The clubs which were ranked between 2nd to 5th places in each division competed in a promotion play-offs, in which the winners, F.C. Kafr Qasim, advanced to the final round, where they lost 1-3 on aggregate to the 14th placed club in Liga Leumit, Hapoel Jerusalem. Thus, F.C. Kafr Qasim remained in Liga Alef.

At the bottom, the bottom two clubs in each division, Maccabi Sektzia Ma'alot-Tarshiha, Ihud Bnei Majd al-Krum (from North division), Bnei Eilat and Hapoel Morasha Ramat HaSharon (from South division) were all automatically relegated to Liga Bet, whilst the two clubs which were ranked in 14th place in each division, Maccabi Daliyat al-Karmel and Maccabi Ironi Amishav Petah Tikva entered a promotion/relegation play-offs. Maccabi Daliyat al-Karmel prevailing to stay in Liga Alef, while Maccabi Ironi Amishav Petah Tikva were relegated after losing the play-offs.

Changes from last season

Team changes
 Hapoel Katamon Jerusalem and Hapoel Ashkelon were promoted to Liga Leumit; Ironi Tiberias (to North division) and Hakoah Amidar Ramat Gan (to South division) were relegated from Liga Leumit.
 Beitar Nahariya and Maccabi Umm al-Fahm were relegated to Liga Bet from North division, whilst F.C. Givat Olga folded following a merger with Hapoel Hadera; Hapoel Kafr Kanna, Hapoel Ironi Baqa al-Gharbiyye and Hapoel Iksal were promoted to the North division from Liga Bet.
 Maccabi Be'er Sheva and Maccabi Kiryat Malakhi were relegated to Liga Bet from South division; Hapoel Bik'at HaYarden and Bnei Eilat were promoted to the South division from Liga Bet.

North Division

South Division

Promotion play-offs

First round
Second and third placed clubs played single match at home against the fourth and fifth placed clubs in their respective regional division.

Hapoel Hadera and Ironi Tiberias (from North division) and F.C. Kafr Qasim and Hapoel Azor (from South division) advanced to the second round.

Second round
The winners of the first round played single match at home of the higher ranked club (from each regional division).

Hapoel Hadera and F.C. Kafr Qasim advanced to the third round.

Third round
Hapoel Hadera and F.C. Kafr Qasim faced each other for a single match in neutral venue. The winner advanced to the fourth round against the 14th placed club in Liga Leumit.

F.C. Kafr Qasim advanced to the promotion/relegation play-offs.

Fourth round - promotion/relegation play-offs
F.C. Kafr Qasim faced the 14th placed in 2015–16 Liga Leumit, Hapoel Jerusalem. The winner on aggregate earned a spot in the 2016–17 Liga Leumit. The matches took place on May 27 and 31, 2016.

Hapoel Jerusalem won 3–1 on aggregate and remained in Liga Leumit. F.C. Kafr Qasim remained in Liga Alef.

Relegation play-offs

North play-off
The 14th placed club in Liga Alef North, Maccabi Daliyat al-Karmel, faced the Liga Bet North play-offs winner, Hapoel Umm al-Fahm. The winner earned a spot in the 2016–17 Liga Alef.

Maccabi Daliyat al-Karmel remained in Liga Alef; Hapoel Umm al-Fahm remained in Liga Bet.

South play-off
The 14th placed club in Liga Alef South, Maccabi Amishav Petah Tikva, faced the Liga Bet South play-offs winner, F.C. Tira. The winner earned a spot in the 2016–17 Liga Alef.

F.C. Tira Promoted to Liga Alef; Maccabi Amishav Petah Tikva relegated to Liga Bet.

References
Liga Alef North 2015/2016 The Israel Football Association 
Liga Alef South 2015/2016 The Israel Football Association 

3
Liga Alef seasons
Israel Liga Alef